Wazihwei Nature Reserve is a nature reserve in Bali District, New Taipei, Taiwan. It is home to egrets, mudskippers, and fiddler crabs.

History
The area was declared as a nature reserve by the Council of Agriculture on 10 January 1994 in order to prevent further damaging to the ecosystem due to the water pollution from Tamsui River.

Geography
The nature reserve is located at the tidal area of Tamsui River bank. It consists of mangrove, mudflats and swamp.

See also
 Geography of Taiwan

References

1994 establishments in Taiwan
Geography of New Taipei
Nature reserves in Taiwan
Tourist attractions in New Taipei